Scoil Lorcain Boys National School was established in 1955 by the Christian Brothers, It is located in St. Johns Park, Waterford. It has a pupil population of approximately 350 students 
 
Past pupils of this school include playwright Jim Nolan.

Education in Waterford (city)
1955 establishments in Ireland
Educational institutions established in 1955